HD 30177 b is an extrasolar planet located approximately 181.6 light-years away in the constellation of Dorado, orbiting the star HD 30177.

Discovery
This planet was discovered on June 13, 2002 by Tinney, Butler, and Marcy et al. using the Doppler spectroscopy from the Anglo-Australian Telescope.

Properties
This is one of the most massive planets ever detected by the radial velocity method. In addition, the planet orbits far from the star, about 4 AU away, taking 2770 days (7.58 years) to orbit the star. Even though the massive planet is orbiting at 4 AU from the star, the radial velocity semi-amplitude is high, around 146.8±2.8 m/s. In 2022, the inclination and true mass of HD 30177 b were measured via astrometry, showing the true mass to be close to the minimum mass.

See also
 Pi Mensae b

References

External links
 
 

Dorado (constellation)
Giant planets
Exoplanets discovered in 2002
Exoplanets detected by radial velocity
Exoplanets detected by astrometry